A zombie is traditionally an undead person in Haitian folklore, and is regularly encountered in fictional horror and fantasy themed works.

Zombi, Zombie, or Zomby may also refer to:

People
 Rob Zombie (born 1965), real name Robert Cummings, former lead singer of White Zombie
 Zomby (born 1980), British music producer
 "The Zombie", the ring name for Tim Arson, professional wrestler for ECW

Arts, entertainment, and media

Fictional entities
 Zombie (comics), a character from Marvel Comics
 Zombie, a creature in the role-playing game Dungeons & Dragons
 Zombie, a creature found within the video game Minecraft

Films
 Dawn of the Dead (1978 film), titled Zombi or Zombies in the European version, a horror film directed by George Romero
 Zombi 2 (1979), also known as Zombie or Zombie Flesh Eaters, a horror film directed by Lucio Fulci
 Zombie Holocaust (1980), also known as Zombi Holocaust or Zombie 3, a horror film directed by Marino Girolami
 Wicked Little Things (2006), also known as Zombies, a horror film directed by J. S. Cardone
 Zombies! Zombies! Zombies!, a 2008 comedy film directed by Jason M. Murphy
 The Dead (2010 film), a British movie shot entirely in Sub-Saharan Africa
 Zombies (2016 film), a horror-action film directed by Hamid Torabpour 
 Zombies (2018 film), a Disney Channel Original Movie
 Zombie (2019 film), a horror-comedy adventure film
 Zombies 2, a Disney Channel Original Movie and the sequel to the 2018 film

Music

Groups
 The Zombies, a 1960s English rock band
 Zombi (band), a progressive rock duo

Albums
 Zombie (album), by Fela Kuti and Afrika 70
 Zombie (EP), by The Devil Wears Prada

Songs
 "Zombie" (The Cranberries song), 1994
 "Zombie" (Jamie T song), 2014
 "Zombie", a song by E-40 from The Block Brochure: Welcome to the Soil 2
 "Zombie", a song by Natalia Kills from Perfectionist
 "Zombie", a song by The Pretty Reckless from The Pretty Reckless EP
 "Zombie", a song by Day6 from The Book of Us: The Demon
 "Zombies", a song by Lacuna Coil from Broken Crown Halo

Gaming
 Zombie Inc., a video game development studio that also creates comic books and licenses films
 Zombie Zombie, a 1984 computer game for the ZX Spectrum
 Zombies!!!, a series of board games by Twilight Creations
 Zombies (video game), a 2011 video game adaptation of the board game
 Zombies Ate My Neighbors, a 1993 video game, known in some countries simply as Zombies
 ZombiU (also known as Zombi), originally a Wii U title, later ported over to the Xbox One, PS4 and PC
 Zombie (magazine), a video gaming magazine published in Israel in the 1990s

Literature
 Zombie (novel), a 1995 novel by Joyce Carol Oates
 Le Zombie, a science-fiction fanzine published by Bob Tucker
 Zom-B, a 2012–16 zombie apocalyptic novel series by Darren Shan

Computing
 Zombie (computing), a compromised computer used to perform malicious tasks
 Zombie object, in garbage-collected object-oriented programming languages, an object that has been finalized but then resurrected
 Zombie process, on Unix-like OS, a process that has completed execution but still has an entry in the process table
 ZombieLoad, a security vulnerability on certain Intel processors

Finance
 Zombie bank, a financial institution with an economic net worth less than zero that continues to operate because of implicit or explicit government support
 Zombie company, a company that needs bailouts in order to operate, or an indebted company that is able to repay the interest on its debts but not repay the principal

Invertebrates
 Zombie ant, an ant infected by the parasitic fungus Ophiocordyceps unilateralis
 Zombie fly, a fly, Apocephalus borealis, that lays eggs in honeybees, which then become "zombees"
 Zombie spider, a spider, Cyclosa argenteoalba, infected by Reclinervellus nielseni

Other uses
 Zombie (cocktail), an exceptionally strong cocktail made of fruit juices, liqueurs, and various rums
 Zombie, a derisive name for Canadian conscripts during World War II; see Conscription Crisis of 1944
 Philosophical zombie, in philosophy, a person without qualia, sentience or conscious experience

See also
      
 
 Smombie
 Xombie (disambiguation)
 Zumbi (disambiguation)
 Zombi (disambiguation)